St Vigeans Church is a Church of Scotland parish church, serving the parish of the ancient village of St Vigeans on the outskirts of Arbroath, Angus, Scotland. The church was rebuilt in the 12th century but not consecrated until 1242 by David de Bernham, Bishop of St Andrews. The church underwent some alteration in the 15th century, but suffered very little change following the Scottish Reformation of 1560. A major restoration was carried out in 1871 by the Scottish Victorian architect Robert Rowand Anderson.

See also
List of Church of Scotland parishes
List of Category A listed buildings in Angus

References

External links
St Vigeans Church

Church of Scotland churches in Scotland
Churches in Angus, Scotland
Category A listed buildings in Angus, Scotland
Listed churches in Scotland
Arbroath